The 34th Annual Tony Awards was broadcast by CBS television on June 8, 1980, from the Mark Hellinger Theatre. The hosts were Mary Tyler Moore and Jason Robards. The theme was  "understudies"; each of the hosts and presenters had been understudies and offered anecdotes of that beginning.

The ceremony
Presenters: Eve Arden, Carol Channing, Hume Cronyn, Faye Dunaway, Mia Farrow, James Earl Jones, Elia Kazan, Richard Kiley, James MacArthur, Nancy Marchand, Dudley Moore, Anthony Perkins, Gilda Radner, Lynn Redgrave, Tony Roberts, Jessica Tandy, Cicely Tyson, Dick Van Dyke.

Musicals represented: 
 A Day in Hollywood / A Night in the Ukraine ("Doin' the Production Code" - Company)
 Barnum ("Come Follow the Band"/"There is a Sucker Born Ev'ry Minute" - Jim Dale and Company)
 Evita ("A New Argentina" - Patti LuPone and Company)
 Oklahoma! ("People Will Say We're In Love" - Joel Higgins and Christine Andreas)
 Peter Pan  ("I'm Flying" - Sandy Duncan and children)
 Sugar Babies ("A McHugh Medley" - Ann Miller and Mickey Rooney)
 West Side Story ("America" - Debbie Allen and Company)

Winners and nominees
Winners are in bold

Special awards
Lawrence Langner Memorial Award for Distinguished Lifetime Achievement in the American Theatre — Helen Hayes
Regional Theatre Award Winner - Actors Theatre of Louisville, Kentucky
Mary Tyler Moore, Whose Life Is It Anyway?.

Multiple nominations and awards

These productions had multiple nominations:

11 nominations: Evita
10 nominations: Barnum 
9 nominations: A Day in Hollywood / A Night in the Ukraine
8 nominations: Sugar Babies 
5 nominations: Talley's Folly 
4 nominations: Children of a Lesser God and Morning's at Seven 
3 nominations: West Side Story
2 nominations: Bent, Betrayal, Home, The Lady from Dubuque, Night and Day, Oklahoma!, Peter Pan and Strider 

The following productions received multiple awards.

7 wins: Evita  
3 wins: Barnum, Children of a Lesser God and Morning's at Seven  
2 wins: A Day in Hollywood / A Night in the Ukraine

See also
 Drama Desk Awards
 1980 Laurence Olivier Awards – equivalent awards for West End theatre productions
 Obie Award
 New York Drama Critics' Circle
 Theatre World Award
 Lucille Lortel Awards

External links
Official Site

Tony Awards ceremonies
1980 in theatre
1980 theatre awards
1980 in New York City
Tony